Maher Abu Remeleh (born 24 August 1983 in Jerusalem) is a Palestinian judoka.

He was honored with the distinction to bare the Palestinian flag at the opening ceremony at the 2012 Summer Olympics. Remeleh is the inaugural Palestinian to qualify for the Olympics on merit.

After receiving a bye in the first round, he lost in the second round 0000–0100 to Dirk Van Tichelt.

References

External links
Associated Press report

1983 births
Olympic judoka of Palestine
Judoka at the 2012 Summer Olympics
Living people
Palestinian male judoka